The Little Friend is the second novel by the American author, Donna Tartt. The novel was initially published by Alfred A. Knopf on October 22, 2002, a decade after her first novel, The Secret History.

The Little Friend  is a mystery adventure, centered on a young girl, Harriet Cleve Dufresnes, living in Mississippi in the early 1970s. The story follows Harriet's anxiety surrounding the unexplained death of her brother, Robin, who was killed by hanging in 1964 at the age of nine. As well, the dynamics of Harriet's extended family–particularly her aunts–are a strong focus of the novel, as are the lifestyles and customs of contrasting Southerners.

In an interview with The Guardian in 2002, Tartt described The Little Friend as "a frightening, scary book about children coming into contact with the world of adults in a frightening way." Tartt told the interviewer that The Little Friend was intentionally different from The Secret History, stating: "I wanted to take on a completely different set of technical problems. The Secret History was all from the point of view of Richard, a single camera, but the new book is symphonic, like War and Peace. That's widely thought to be the most difficult form."

Plot
In the mid-1960s, on Mother's Day, Robin, the eldest child and only son of the Dufresnes, a white family living in Mississippi, is found hanging from a tree on the family property. Only nine years old at the time of his death, Robin's murder causes his mother, Charlotte, to sink into a listless depression and his father, Dixon, to abandon the family on the pretext of work.

Twelve years later Robin's two younger sisters, Allison and Harriet, are now sixteen and twelve years old, respectively. Harriet, the younger child, is considered particularly difficult as she is intensely smart but uncompromising. Harriet has developed a morbid fascination with her brother and with the past of her matrilineal family, the Cleves. Her great-grandfather, Judge Cleve, once owned the local mansion, "Tribulation", but lost the family's wealth in his declining years.

Harriet's fascination with her brother's death leads her to decide to find the murderer with the reluctant help of her younger but devoted friend, a boy, Hely Hull. The Dufresnes' stalwart black maid, Ida Rhew, reveals that Robin had a fight with another boy shortly before his death. Harriet discovers that the boy is Danny Ratliff, the son of a highly dysfunctional local methamphetamine producing family. Farish Ratliff, an elder brother, runs the drug business with the help of Danny and the connivance of his grandmother, Gum. Farish, not a particularly intelligent man, is planning a drug shipment hidden within a truck transporting venomous snakes, which another brother, Eugene, uses to support his Evangelical preaching.

Harriet believes that Danny is the murderer and resolves to exact revenge by stealing a cobra kept by Eugene, and dropping it into Danny's Trans Am vehicle. Harriet is also distraught at her parent's mean-spirited dismissal of the much loved Ida. After a near disastrous encounter with the Ratliffs when the brothers attempt to transport the drugs, Harriet and Hely manage to steal the cobra from Eugene's office. They proceed to drop the snake into the Trans Am from an abandoned road bridge but discover that the car was driven not by Danny but by his grandmother, Gum, who is severely bitten and hospitalized. The Ratliffs deduce that Harriet had been involved in the attack and seek her out after she returns early from summer camp following the death of her favourite great-aunt.

Danny resolves to steal some of his own family's drugs and use them to buy his way out of town. Danny knows that drugs were hidden by his brother, after the failed shipment, in a water tower where they are also discovered by Harriet who throws them into the water. Farish becomes increasingly deranged by the consumption of his own product and violently forces Danny to take him for a drive. Danny drives towards the water tower where he fatally shoots Farish.

After killing his brother, Danny discovers Harriet in the water tower and attempts to drown her. Harriet, who has been coincidentally practicing holding her breath, pretends to drown but is able to escape when the non-swimming Danny falls back into the water. Harriet climbs out of the tank, but the ladder collapses behind her leaving Danny to drown. 
 
Harriet's father, Dixon, visits her while she is recovering from her ordeal in hospital and reveals that Danny had in fact been Robin's "little friend" and was distraught when he heard of Robin's death. The authorities never discover Harriet and Hely's involvement with the Ratliffs, as her doctors consider her condition to be the result of an epileptic episode.

However, Danny does not drown in the tank. Instead, he is arrested there and charged with his brother's murder.

Ultimately, the novel ends with the identity of Robin's murderer remaining a mystery.

Themes
The book largely focuses on the life of Harriet and her friend Hely as they investigate the death of Harriet's brother Robin. Throughout the book, Harriet references Treasure Island, The Jungle Book, a book about the life of Robert Falcon Scott and a fairy tale about the King of Snakes while, in contrast, Hely often references From Russia with Love.

Happiness and methods of coping with tragedy are explored throughout the book, mostly as character study. Many of the adults of the book, from Harriet's neglectful mother Charlotte, to Harriet's tough grandmother Edie view life from a defeated and cautious standpoint, respectively, in contrast with the more optimistic youthful outlook of the steadfast, brave Harriet and Hely. The outlaw brothers Farish Ratliff and Danny Ratliff, caught up in a world of drugs, seem miserable most the time. Few outwardly happy characters exist in the book besides Curtis Ratliff and the car salesman Roy Dial.

Christianity is referenced throughout the book in the form of snake handling preachers, Baptists, and Mormonism, as well as an epigraph attributed to Saint Thomas Aquinas.

The social culture of Mississippi is featured throughout the book.

Death is a theme explored in the book along with the cheating of death. For Harriet, this fascination stems from her brother Robin's murder before she was old enough to know him. But this is also shown via Harriet's interest in Houdini, references to Lazarus in the Baptist church after Robin dies, Harriet's reading about Robert Falcon Scott, Harriet's practicing holding her breath to imitate Houdini's underwater tricks, and at the climax of the story, Harriet's escape from Danny Ratliff by playing dead in the water tower by holding her breath. Danny Ratliff also escapes death in the water tower - not knowing how to swim - by jumping up from the bottom of the water tower tank for two days to grab breaths of air until he is discovered. The snake-handling preacher from Kentucky, Loyal Reese, represents a form of cheating death with his numerous boxes of venomous snakes and his preaching style. In unrelated incidents, Gum Ratliff and Eugene Ratliff are bitten by those venomous snakes and both survive. Farish Ratliff is said to have survived a gunshot wound to the head earlier in his life, while he dies with the second shot to the head later in the book. Hely cheats death after releasing Loyal's venomous snakes in Eugene's office while attempting to escape unnoticed. After Harriet's great aunt Libby dies, Harriet's fascination with death becomes more intense and sad, but the author seems to reference her grandmother Edith in Harriet's behavior.

Extended family dynamics and support systems are another theme of the book. In the wake of Robin's death, a network that includes Harriet's grandmother Edith, Harriet's three great aunts - Libby, Tat, and Adelaide - and the housekeeper Ida coalesce to help raise Harriet and Allison while their mother retreats to her bedroom most days and her father moves to another state for his job and has an extended affair.

Reception
Both Ruth Franklin of The New Republic and A. O. Scott of The New York Times reviewed the book positively. Franklin highlighted Tartt's literary "obsess[ion] with crimes that go unpunished," while Scott described the book as "tragic, fever-dream realism."

The novel won the WH Smith Literary Award and was shortlisted for the Orange Prize for Fiction in 2003.

Book Cover Design 
The jacket design is by Chip Kidd, a New York City book cover designer.

References

External links
David Hare review in Guardian Unlimited (October 27, 2002)
Oxonian Review: "Donna Tartt's Confused Little Friend"

Video
RTE TV panel discussion

Audio
NPR: Talk of the Nation: Donna Tartt interviewed by Lynn Neary (November 5, 2002)
Donna Tartt reads The Little Friend at a Jackson, Mississippi bookstore (November 13, 2002)

2002 American novels
Books with cover art by Chip Kidd
American gothic novels
Novels set in Mississippi
Fiction set in the 1970s
Alfred A. Knopf books